Susanna Samuels Epp (born 1943) is an author, mathematician, and professor.  Her interests include discrete mathematics, mathematical logic, cognitive psychology, and mathematics education, and she has written numerous articles, publications, and textbooks.  She is currently professor emerita at DePaul University, where she chaired the Department of Mathematical Sciences and was Vincent de Paul Professor in Mathematics.

Education and career
Epp holds degrees in mathematics from Northwestern University and the University of Chicago, where she completed her doctorate in 1968 under the supervision of Irving Kaplansky. She taught at Boston University and at the University of Illinois at Chicago before becoming a professor at DePaul University.

Contributions
Initially researching commutative algebra, Epp became interested by cognitive psychology, especially in education of Mathematics, Logic, Proof, and the Language of mathematics.  She wrote several articles about teaching logic and proof in American Mathematical Monthly, and the Mathematics Teacher, a Journal by the National Council of Teachers of Mathematics.

She is the author of several books including Discrete Mathematics with Applications (4th ed., Brooks/Cole, 2011), the third edition of which earned a Textbook Excellence Award from the Textbook and Academic Authors Association.

"By combining discussion of theory and practice, I have tried to show that mathematics has engaging and important applications as well as being interesting and beautiful in its own right" - Susanna S. Epp wrote in the Preface of the 4th Edition of Discrete Mathematics.

Recognition
In 2005, she received the Louise Hay Award from the Association for Women in Mathematics in recognition for her contributions to mathematics education.

Selected publications
 
 
 Epp, S.S., Variables in Mathematics Education. In Tools for Teaching Logic. Blackburn, P., van Ditmarsch, H., et al., eds. Springer Publishing, 2011. (Reprinted in Best Writing on Mathematics 2012, M. Pitici, Ed. Princeton Univ. Press, Nov. 2012.)
 Epp, S.S., V. Durand-Guerrier, et al. Argumentation and proof in the mathematics classroom. In Proof and Proving in Mathematics Education, G. Hanna & M. de Villiers Eds. Springer Publishing. (co-authors: V. Durand-Guerrier, P. Boero, N. Douek, D. Tanguay), 2012.
 Epp, S.S., V. Durand-Guerrier, et al.  Examining the role of logic in teaching proof. In Proof and Proving in Mathematics Education, G. Hanna & M. de Villiers Eds. Springer Publishing, 2012.
 Epp, S.S., Proof Issues with Existential Quantification. In Proof and Proving in Mathematics Education: ICMI Study 19 Conference Proceedings, F. L. Lin et al. eds., National Taiwan Normal University, 2009.
 Epp, S.S., The Use of Logic in Teaching Proof. In Resources for Teaching Discrete Mathematics. B. Hopkins, ed. Washington, DC: Mathematical Association of America, 2009, pp. 313–322. 
 Epp, S.S., The Role of Logic in Teaching Proof, American Mathematical Monthly (110)10, Dec. 2003, 886-899
 Epp, S.S., The Language of Quantification in Mathematics Instruction. In Developing Mathematical Reasoning in Grades K-12. Lee V. Stiff, Ed. Reston, VA: NCTM Publications, 1999, 188-197. 
 Epp, S.S., The Role of Proof in Problem Solving. In Mathematical Thinking and Problem Solving. Alan H. Schoenfeld, Ed. Hillsdale, NJ: Lawrence Erlbaum Associates, Inc., Publishers, 1994, 257-269.

References

External links
 Susanna Epp's webpage at De Paul
 Fifteenth Annual Louise Hay Award, contains a brief biography of Susanna S. Epp.

1943 births
20th-century American mathematicians
21st-century American mathematicians
American women mathematicians
Living people
DePaul University faculty
Mathematical logicians
Women logicians
21st-century women mathematicians
21st-century American women
20th-century women mathematicians
20th-century American women